Hibbertia diffusa, commonly known as wedge guinea flower, is a species of flowering plant in the family Dilleniaceae and is endemic to south-eastern Australia. It is a prostrate to low-lying shrub with glabrous stems, egg-shaped to lance-shaped leaves with the narrower end towards the base, and bright yellow flowers arranged on the ends of branchlets, with twenty to twenty-five stamens arranged around two or three carpels.

Description
There are twenty to twenty-five stamens arranged in groups around the two or three glabrous carpels. Flowering occurs from September to November.

Taxonomy
Hibbertia diffusa was first formally described in 1817 by Augustin Pyramus de Candolle in his Regni Vegetabilis Systema Naturale from an unpublished description by Robert Brown.

Distribution and habitat
Wedge guinea flower grows in open forest on the coast and ranges of south-eastern Queensland, New South Wales and far north-eastern Victoria.

References

diffusa
Flora of New South Wales
Flora of Victoria (Australia)
Flora of Queensland
Plants described in 1817
Taxa named by Augustin Pyramus de Candolle